Talkin' 'bout Soul consisted of tracks recorded by Little Richard for Vee-Jay Records in 1964 and 1965. All of the songs had been released before except "You Better Stop". "Something Moves In My Heart" had previously been included on the 1971 UK released album, Mr. Big, under the title "Every Time I Think About You". This album is essentially the Mr. Big album with one extra previously unreleased track.

History
As covered on the entry for Little Richard Is Back (And There's A Whole Lotta Shakin' Goin' On!), Richard recorded nearly fifty tracks for Vee-Jay Records in 1964 and 1965. With the collapse of Vee Jay, some tracks were unreleased until they appeared on Mr. Big.

Track listing
"Without Love" (3:19)
"Dance What You Wanna" (2:23)
"My Wheels They Are Slippin' All The Way" (2:26)
"You Better Stop" (3:08) w Jimi Hendrix
"I Don't Know What You Got (But It's Got Me) (Part 1, extended)" (4:04) w Jimi Hendrix, Billy Preston
"Talkin' 'bout Soul" (2:10)
"Somethin' Moves In My Heart" (2:12)
"It Ain't What You Do" (2:24)
"Cross Over" (2:40)
"Jenny Jenny" (1:58) w Jimi Hendrix, Esquerita
"Dancing All Around The World" (2:57) w Jimi Hendrix

References

1974 albums
Little Richard albums